Trinidad and Tobago football clubs have entered international competitions since 1967, when Regiment of the Port of Spain Football League took part in the 1967 CONCACAF Champions' Cup. Since the nation's first international club competition, several association football clubs from Trinidad and Tobago have entered North America, Central America, and Caribbean competitions (CONCACAF Champions' Cup/Champions League and CFU Club Championship).

The CONCACAF Champions' Cup started in 1962, but there was no Trinidad and Tobago representative during that inaugural season as the competition was open to eight teams from seven countries: Netherlands Antilles, Costa Rica, El Salvador, Guatemala, Haiti, Honduras, and México. Since their first appearance, Trinidad and Tobago clubs have claimed the Champions' Cup on two occasions with Defence Force winning the title in 1978 and again in 1985 in the Teteron Boys''' treble-winning season.

Since the establishment of the CFU Club Championship in 1997, clubs from the Caribbean Islands that are members of the Caribbean Football Union, have competed in the region's qualification tournament for the CONCACAF Champions' Cup and Champions League. The first club to compete in the regional competition was United Petrotrin of the Semi-Professional League. The Oilmen won the inaugural tournament after defeating Seba United of Jamaica 2–1 to advance to the 1997 Champions' Cup. Since the country's first appearance in the CFU Club Championship, Trinidad and Tobago clubs have claimed the title on eleven occasions with an additional nine runners-up finishes.

Qualification for continental competitions

Champions of continental competitions

Full continental competition record

CONCACAF Champions' Cup and Champions League

CFU Club Championship

TT Pro League international performance
Since the inaugural season of the TT Pro League in 1999, the league champion and runners-up have entered the CFU Club Championship to earn qualification in the CONCACAF Champions' Cup/Champions League. The first Pro League club to compete in international competition was Joe Public when the club entered the 1999 CONCACAF Champions' Cup. However, the Eastern Lions qualified for the competition through the 1998 CFU Club Championship as a member of the Semi-Professional League the previous season. The 2000 CFU Club Championship was the first occurrence of clubs having earned qualification through final position in the Pro League. Defence Force entered as the 1999 Pro League champion, W Connection as runners-up, and Joe Public as the CFU Club Championship holders. Joe Public won the competition to provide the Pro League with its first international championship.

Pro League clubs have won the CFU Club Championship for Caribbean-based clubs on eleven occasions and nine additional runners-up finishes. However, no Pro League club has won the Champions' Cup or Champions League. The best performance occurred in the 2000, 2004, and 2007 Champions' Cup when Joe Public, San Juan Jabloteh, and W Connection, respectively, entered the quarterfinal round.

CONCACAF Champions' Cup and Champions League

Note: The CONCACAF Champions' Cup began in 1962 and was renamed the CONCACAF Champions League in 2008–09 (abbreviated here to 2009). Trinidad and Tobago clubs began entering the continental competition in 1967. After the inauguration of the TT Pro League in 1999, teams from the Pro League were playing in CONCACAF competition during that season (abbreviated to 2009), even though they had actually qualified through the old Semi-Professional League the previous season.

Trinidad and Tobago finalists (1962–present)
For comparison, this table shows how Trinidad and Tobago clubs have performed at the top level of CONCACAF football before the TT Pro League era. Defence Force remains the only team from Trinidad and Tobago to win the Champions' Cup in 1978 and 1985. Since the Teteron Boys''' treble-winning season, the best performance by a Trinidad and Tobago team came in 1987 and 1988 when Defence Force, and again in 1991 when Police finished as runners-up.

All finalists performance by club (1962–present)
On this table, covering before and during the TT Pro League era, the best-performing ten clubs are listed. Pro League club, Defence Force, is tied for ninth best-performing club in the CONCACAF Champions' Cup and Champions League.

All finalists performance by nation
For comparison, the following tables show the performance of all finalists in CONCACAF Champions' Cup and Champions League before and during the TT Pro League era. Although Trinidad and Tobago clubs performed well before the establishment of the TT Pro League, professional clubs have not reached the final of the continental competition.

CFU Club Championship

The Caribbean Football Union established the Caribbean Club Championship in 1997 as a qualification tournament for the CONCACAF Champions' Cup (later renamed the Champions League). The inaugural season of the TT Pro League was in 1999, so teams entering the regional competition based on Pro League finish began in 2000.

TT Pro League finalists (2000–present)
This table shows how Trinidad and Tobago clubs have performed in the CFU Club Championship since the start of the TT Pro League era. The table is currently headed by W Connection, with three wins, followed by Central FC (2), Morvant Caledonia United (1), Defence Force (1), Joe Public (1), and San Juan Jabloteh (1).

Trinidad and Tobago finalists (1997–present)
This table combines the Trinidad and Tobago totals before and during the TT Pro League era. It shows that thanks to its earlier win in 1998, Joe Public, with two wins, have moved into second place, but still trail behind W Connection with three wins.

All finalists' performance by club (1997–present)
On this table, covering before and during the TT Pro League era, the best-performing Pro League club, W Connection, is also the best-performing club in the CFU Club Championship ahead of fellow Pro League clubs Joe Public and Central FC, Puerto Rico Islanders, and Jamaican club Harbour View.

All finalists' performance by nation
For comparison, the following tables show the performance of all finalists in the CFU Club Championship before and during the TT Pro League era, when Trinidad and Tobago were narrowly in first place in terms of number of wins, compared to having by far the most finalists compared to other nations.

References

TT Pro League